A Carson top is a one-piece, padded, upholstered, removable top. The design was invented by Bob Houser in 1935 when he worked for Amos Carson at Carson Top Shop in Los Angeles. The first Carson top was probably made for a Ford Model A convertible and nowadays it is mostly used on hot rods and customs.

Convertibles